Procopius of Caesarea ( Prokópios ho Kaisareús; ;  – 565) was a prominent late antique Greek scholar and historian from Caesarea Maritima. Accompanying the Roman general Belisarius in Emperor Justinian's wars, Procopius became the principal Roman historian of the 6th century, writing the History of the Wars, the Buildings, and the Secret History.

Life
Apart from his own writings, the main source for Procopius's life was an entry in the Suda, a Byzantine Greek encyclopaedia written sometime after 975 which discusses his early life. He was a native of Caesarea in the province of Palaestina Prima. He would have received a conventional upper class education in the Greek classics and rhetoric, perhaps at the famous school at Gaza. He may have attended law school, possibly at Berytus (present-day Beirut) or Constantinople (now Istanbul), and became a lawyer (rhetor). He evidently knew Latin, as was natural for a man with legal training. In 527, the first year of the reign of the emperor JustinianI, he became the legal adviser for Belisarius, a general whom Justinian made his chief military commander in a great attempt to restore control over the lost western provinces of the empire.

Procopius was with Belisarius on the eastern front until the latter was defeated at the Battle of Callinicum in 531 and recalled to Constantinople. Procopius witnessed the Nika riots of January, 532, which Belisarius and his fellow general Mundus repressed with a massacre in the Hippodrome. In 533, he accompanied Belisarius on his victorious expedition against the Vandal kingdom in North Africa, took part in the capture of Carthage, and remained in Africa with Belisarius's successor Solomon the Eunuch when Belisarius returned east to the capital. Procopius recorded a few of the extreme weather events of 535–536, although these were presented as a backdrop to Byzantine military activities, such as a mutiny in and around Carthage. He rejoined Belisarius for his campaign against the Ostrogothic kingdom in Italy and experienced the Gothic siege of Rome that lasted a year and nine days, ending in mid-March 538. He witnessed Belisarius's entry into the Gothic capital, Ravenna, in 540. Both the Wars and the Secret History suggest that his relationship with Belisarius cooled thereafter. When Belisarius was sent back to Italy in 544 to cope with a renewal of the war with the Goths, now led by the able king Totila, Procopius appears to have no longer been on Belisarius's staff.

As magister militum, Belisarius was an "illustrious man" (illoústrios); being his , Procopius must therefore have had at least the rank of a "visible man" (vir spectabilis). He thus belonged to the mid-ranking group of the senatorial order. Should this information be correct, Procopius would have had a seat in Constantinople's senate, which was restricted to the  under Justinian. He also wrote that under Justinian's reign in 560, a major Christian church dedicated to the Virgin Mary was built on the site of the Temple Mount.

It is not certain when Procopius died. Many historiansincluding Howard-Johnson, Cameron, and Geoffrey Greatrexdate his death to 554, but there was an urban prefect of Constantinople who called Procopius in 562. In that year, Belisarius was implicated in a conspiracy and was brought before this urban prefect.

In fact, some scholars have argued that Procopius died at least a few years after 565 as he unequivocally states in the beginning of his Secret History that he planned to publish it after the death of Justinian for fear he would be tortured and killed by the emperor (or even by general Belisarius) if the emperor (or the general) learned about what Procopius wrote (his scathing criticism of the emperor, of his wife, of Belisarius, of the general's wife, Antonia: calling the former "demons in human form" and the latter incompetent and treacherous) in this later history. However, most scholars believe that the Secret History was written in 550 and remained unpublished during Procopius' lifetime.

Writings

The writings of Procopius are the primary source of information for the rule of the emperor JustinianI. Procopius was the author of a history in eight books on the wars prosecuted by Justinian, a panegyric on the emperor's public works projects throughout the empire, and a book known as the Secret History that claims to report the scandals that Procopius could not include in his officially sanctioned history for fear of angering the emperor, his wife, Belisarius, and the general's wife and had to wait until all of them were dead to avoid retaliation.

History of the Wars
The first seven books seem to have been largely completed by 545 and may have been published as a unit. They were, however, updated to mid-century before publication, with the latest mentioned event occurring in early 551. The eighth and final book brings the history to 553.

The first two booksoften known as The Persian Wardeal with the conflict between the Romans and Sassanid Persia in Mesopotamia, Syria, Armenia, Lazica, and  Iberia (present-day Georgia). It details the campaigns of the Sassanid shah  KavadhI, the 532  'Nika' revolt, the war by Kavadh's successor  KhosrauI in 540, his destruction of Antioch and deportation of its inhabitants to Mesopotamia, and the great plague that devastated the empire from 542. The Persian War also covers the early career of Procopius's patron Belisarius in some detail.

The Wars’ next two booksknown as The Vandal War or Vandalic Warcover Belisarius's successful campaign against the Vandal kingdom that had occupied Rome's provinces in northwest Africa for the last century.

The final four booksknown as The Gothic Warcover the Italian campaigns by Belisarius and others against the Ostrogoths. Procopius includes accounts of the 1st and 2nd sieges of Naples and the 1st, 2nd, and 3rd sieges of Rome. He also includes an account of the rise of the Franks (see Arborychoi). The last book describes the eunuch Narses's successful conclusion of the Italian campaign and includes some coverage of campaigns along the empire's eastern borders as well.

The Wars proved influential on later Byzantine historiography.
In the 570s  Agathias wrote Histories, a continuation of Procopius's work in a similar style.

Secret History

Procopius's now famous Anecdota, also known as Secret History (Apókryphe Historía), was discovered centuries later at the Vatican Library in Rome and published in Lyon by Niccolò Alamanni in 1623. Its existence was already known from the Suda, which referred to it as Procopius's "unpublished works" containing "comedy" and "invective" of Justinian, Theodora, Belisarius and Antonina. The Secret History covers roughly the same years as the first seven books of The History of the Wars and appears to have been written after they were published. Current consensus generally dates it to 550, or less commonly 558.

In the eyes of many scholars, the Secret History reveals an author who had become deeply disillusioned with Emperor Justinian, his wife Theodora, the general Belisarius, and his wife Antonina. The work claims to expose the secret springs of their public actions, as well as the private lives of the emperor and his entourage. Justinian is portrayed as cruel, venal, prodigal, and incompetent. In one passage, it is even claimed that he was possessed by demonic spirits or was himself a demon:

Similarly, the Theodora of the Secret History is a garish portrait of vulgarity and insatiable lust juxtaposed with cold-blooded self-interest, shrewishness, and envious and fearful mean-spiritedness. Among the more titillating (and dubious) revelations in the Secret History is Procopius's account of Theodora's thespian accomplishments:

Furthermore, Secret History portrays Belisarius as a weak man completely emasculated by his wife, Antonina, who is portrayed in very similar terms to Theodora. They are both said to be former actresses and close friends. Procopius claimed Antonina worked as an agent for Theodora against Belisarius, and had an ongoing affair with Belisarius' godson, Theodosius.

On the other hand, it has been argued that Procopius prepared the Secret History as an exaggerated document out of fear that a conspiracy might overthrow Justinian's regime, whichas a kind of court historianmight be reckoned to include him. The unpublished manuscript would then have been a kind of insurance, which could be offered to the new ruler as a way to avoid execution or exile after the coup. If this hypothesis were correct, the Secret History would not be proof that Procopius hated Justinian or Theodora.

The Buildings

The first book may date to before the collapse of the first dome of Hagia Sophia in 557, but some scholars think that it is possible that the work postdates the building of the bridge over the Sangarius in the late 550s. Historians consider Buildings to be an incomplete work due to evidence of the surviving version being a draft with two possible redactions.

Buildings was likely written at Justinian's behest, and it is doubtful that its sentiments expressed are sincere. It tells us nothing further about Belisarius, and it takes a sharply different attitude towards Justinian. He is presented as an idealised Christian emperor who built churches for the glory of God and defenses for the safety of his subjects. He is depicted showing particular concern for the water supply, building new aqueducts and restoring those that had fallen into disuse. Theodora, who was dead when this panegyric was written, is mentioned only briefly, but Procopius's praise of her beauty is fulsome.

Due to the panegyrical nature of Procopius's Buildings, historians have discovered several discrepancies between claims made by Procopius and accounts in other primary sources. A prime example is Procopius's starting the reign of Justinian in 518, which was actually the start of the reign of his uncle and predecessor  By treating the uncle's reign as part of his nephew's, Procopius was able to credit Justinian with buildings erected or begun under Justin's administration. Such works include renovation of the walls of Edessa after its 525 flood and consecration of several churches in the region. Similarly, Procopius falsely credits Justinian for the extensive refortification of the cities of Tomis and Histria in Scythia Minor. This had actually been carried out under  who reigned before Justin.

Style
Procopius belongs to the school of late antique historians who continued the traditions of the Second Sophistic. They wrote in Attic Greek. Their models were Herodotus, Polybius and in particular Thucydides. Their subject matter was secular history. They avoided vocabulary unknown to Attic Greek and inserted an explanation when they had to use contemporary words. Thus Procopius includes glosses of monks ("the most temperate of Christians") and churches (as equivalent to a "temple" or "shrine"), since monasticism was unknown to the ancient Athenians and their ekklesía had been a popular assembly. 

The secular historians eschewed the history of the Christian church.  Ecclesiastical history was left to a separate genre after Eusebius. However, Cameron has argued convincingly that Procopius's works reflect the tensions between the classical and Christian models of history in 6th-century Constantinople. This is supported by Whitby's analysis of Procopius's depiction of the capital and its cathedral in comparison to contemporary pagan panegyrics. Procopius can be seen as depicting Justinian as essentially God's vicegerent, making the case for buildings being a primarily religious panegyric. Procopius indicates that he planned to write an ecclesiastical history himself and, if he had, he would probably have followed the rules of that genre. As far as known, however, such an ecclesiastical history was never written.

Some historians have criticized Propocius's description of some barbarians, for example, he dehumanized the unfamiliar Moors as "not even properly human". This was however, inline with Byzantine ethnographic practice in late antiquity.

Legacy
A number of historical novels based on Procopius's works (along with other sources) have been written. Count Belisarius was written by poet and novelist Robert Graves in 1938. Procopius himself appears as a minor character in Felix Dahn's A Struggle for Rome and in L. Sprague de Camp's alternate history novel Lest Darkness Fall. The novel's main character, archaeologist Martin Padway, derives most of his knowledge of historical events from the Secret History.

The narrator in Herman Melville's novel Moby-Dick cites Procopius's description of a captured sea monster as evidence of the narrative's feasibility.

List of selected works

See also
 Jordanes
 Gregory of Tours

Notes

References

 This article is based on an earlier version  by James Allan Evans, originally posted at Nupedia.

Further reading
Adshead, Katherine: Procopius' Poliorcetica: continuities and discontinuities, in: G. Clarke et al. (eds.): Reading the past in late antiquity, Australian National UP, Rushcutters Bay 1990, pp. 93–119 
Alonso-Núñez, J. M.: Jordanes and Procopius on Northern Europe, in: Nottingham Medieval Studies 31 (1987), 1–16.
Amitay, Ory: Procopius of Caesarea and the Girgashite Diaspora, in: Journal for the Study of the Pseudepigrapha 20 (2011), 257–276.
Anagnostakis, Ilias: Procopius's dream before the campaign against Libya: a reading of Wars 3.12.1-5, in: C. Angelidi and G. Calofonos (eds.), Dreaming in Byzantium and Beyond, Farnham: Ashgate Publishing 2014, 79–94.
Bachrach, Bernard S.: Procopius, Agathias and the Frankish Military, in: Speculum 45 (1970), 435–441.
Bachrach, Bernard S.: Procopius and the chronology of Clovis's reign, in: Viator 1 (1970), 21–32.
Baldwin, Barry: An Aphorism in Procopius, in: Rheinisches Museum für Philologie 125 (1982), 309–311.
Baldwin, Barry: Sexual Rhetoric in Procopius, in: Mnemosyne 40 (1987), pp. 150–152
Belke, Klaus: Prokops De aedificiis, Buch V, zu Kleinasien, in: Antiquité Tardive 8 (2000), 115–125.
Börm, Henning: Prokop und die Perser. Stuttgart: Franz Steiner Verlag, 2007. (Review in English by G. Greatrex and Review in English by A. Kaldellis)
Börm, Henning: Procopius of Caesarea, in Encyclopaedia Iranica Online, New York 2013.
 Börm, Henning: Procopius, his predecessors, and the genesis of the Anecdota: Antimonarchic discourse in late antique historiography, in: H. Börm (ed.): Antimonarchic discourse in Antiquity. Stuttgart: Franz Steiner Verlag 2015, 305–346.
Braund, David: Procopius on the Economy of Lazica, in: The Classical Quarterly 41  (1991), 221–225.
Brodka, Dariusz: Die Geschichtsphilosophie in der spätantiken Historiographie. Studien zu Prokopios von Kaisareia, Agathias von Myrina und Theophylaktos Simokattes. Frankfurt am Main: Peter Lang, 2004.
Burn, A. R.: Procopius and the island of ghosts, in: English Historical Review 70 (1955), 258–261.
Cameron, Averil: Procopius and the Sixth Century. Berkeley: University of California Press, 1985.
Cameron, Averil: The scepticism of Procopius, in: Historia 15 (1966), 466–482.
Colvin, Ian: Reporting Battles and Understanding Campaigns in Procopius and Agathias: Classicising Historians' Use of Archived Documents as Sources, in: A. Sarantis (ed.): War and warfare in late antiquity. Current perspectives, Leiden: Brill 2013, 571–598.
Cresci, Lia Raffaella: Procopio al confine tra due tradizioni storiografiche, in: Rivista di Filologia e di Istruzione Classica 129 (2001), 61–77.
Cristini, Marco: Il seguito ostrogoto di Amalafrida: confutazione di Procopio, Bellum Vandalicum 1.8.12, in: Klio 99 (2017), 278–289.
Cristini, Marco: Totila and the Lucanian Peasants: Procop. Goth. 3.22.20, in: Greek, Roman and Byzantine Studies 61 (2021), 73–84.
Croke, Brian and James Crow: Procopius and Dara, in: The Journal of Roman Studies 73 (1983), 143–159.
Downey, Glanville: The Composition of Procopius, De Aedificiis, in: Transactions and Proceedings of the American Philological Association 78 (1947), 171–183.
Evans, James A. S.: Justinian and the Historian Procopius, in: Greece & Rome 17 (1970), 218–223.
Evans, James A. S.: Procopius. New York: Twayne Publishers, 1972.
Gordon, C. D.: Procopius and Justinian's Financial Policies, in: Phoenix 13 (1959), 23–30.
Greatrex, Geoffrey: Procopius and the Persian Wars, D.Phil. thesis, Oxford, 1994.
Greatrex, Geoffrey: The dates of Procopius' works, in: BMGS 18 (1994), 101–114.
Greatrex, Geoffrey: The Composition of Procopius' Persian Wars and John the Cappadocian, in: Prudentia 27 (1995), 1–13.
Greatrex, Geoffrey: Rome and Persia at War, 502–532. London: Francis Cairns, 1998.
Greatrex, Geoffrey: Recent work on Procopius and the composition of Wars VIII, in: BMGS 27 (2003), 45–67.
Greatrex, Geoffrey: Perceptions of Procopius in Recent Scholarship, in: Histos 8 (2014), 76–121 and 121a–e (addenda).
Greatrex, Geoffrey: Procopius of Caesarea: The Persian Wars. A Historical Commentary. Cambridge, Cambridge University Press, 2022.
Howard-Johnson, James: The Education and Expertise of Procopius, in: Antiquité Tardive 10 (2002), 19–30
 Kaçar, Turhan: "Procopius in Turkey", Histos Supplement 9 (2019) 19.1–8.
 Kaegi, Walter: Procopius the military historian, in: Byzantinische Forschungen. 15, 1990, 53–85 (online (PDF; 989 KB)).
Kaldellis, Anthony: Classicism, Barbarism, and Warfare: Prokopios and the Conservative Reaction to Later Roman Military Policy, American Journal of Ancient History, n.s. 3-4 (2004-2005 [2007]), 189–218.
Kaldellis, Anthony: Identifying Dissident Circles in Sixth-Century Byzantium: The Friendship of Prokopios and Ioannes Lydos, Florilegium, Vol. 21 (2004), 1–17.
Kaldellis, Anthony: Procopius of Caesarea: Tyranny, History and Philosophy at the End of Antiquity. Philadelphia: University of Pennsylvania Press, 2004.
Kaldellis, Anthony: Prokopios’ Persian War: A Thematic and Literary Analysis, in: R. Macrides, ed., History as Literature in Byzantium, Aldershot: Ashgate, 2010, 253–273.
Kaldellis, Anthony: Prokopios’ Vandal War: Thematic Trajectories and Hidden Transcripts, in: S. T. Stevens & J. Conant, eds., North Africa under Byzantium and Early Islam, Washington, D.C: Dumbarton Oaks, 2016, 13–21.
Kaldellis, Anthony: The Date and Structure of Prokopios’ Secret History and his Projected Work on Church History, in: Greek, Roman, and Byzantine Studies, Vol. 49 (2009), 585–616.
Kovács, Tamás: "Procopius's Sibyl - the fall of Vitigis and the Ostrogoths", Graeco-Latina Brunensia 24.2 (2019), 113–124.
Kruse, Marion: The Speech of the Armenians in Procopius: Justinian's Foreign Policy and the Transition between Books 1 and 2 of the Wars, in: The Classical Quarterly 63 (2013), 866–881.
 Lillington-Martin, Christopher, 2007–2017:
 2007, "Archaeological and Ancient Literary Evidence for a Battle near Dara Gap, Turkey, AD 530: Topography, Texts and Trenches" in BAR –S1717, 2007 The Late Roman Army in the Near East from Diocletian to the Arab Conquest Proceedings of a colloquium held at Potenza, Acerenza and Matera, Italy edited by Ariel S. Lewin and Pietrina Pellegrini, pp. 299–311;
 2009, "Procopius, Belisarius and the Goths" in Journal of the Oxford University History Society,(2009) Odd Alliances edited by Heather Ellis and Graciela Iglesias Rogers. , pages 1– 17, https://sites.google.com/site/jouhsinfo/issue7specialissueforinternetexplorer;
 2011, "Secret Histories", http://classicsconfidential.co.uk/2011/11/19/secret-histories/;
 2012, "Hard and Soft Power on the Eastern Frontier: a Roman Fortlet between Dara and Nisibis, Mesopotamia, Turkey: Prokopios’ Mindouos?" in The Byzantinist, edited by Douglas Whalin, Issue 2 (2012), pp. 4–5, http://oxfordbyzantinesociety.files.wordpress.com/2012/06/obsnews2012final.pdf;
 2013, Procopius on the struggle for Dara and Rome, in A. Sarantis, N. Christie (eds.): War and Warfare in Late Antiquity: Current Perspectives (Late Antique Archaeology 8.1–8.2 2010–11),  Leiden: Brill 2013, pp. 599–630, ;
 2013 “La defensa de Roma por Belisario” in: Justiniano I el Grande (Desperta Ferro) edited by Alberto Pérez Rubio, no. 18 (July 2013), pages 40–45, ISSN 2171-9276;
 2017, Procopius of Caesarea: Literary and Historical Interpretations (editor), Routledge (July 2017), www.routledge.com/9781472466044;
Maas, Michael Robert: Strabo and Procopius: Classical Geography for a Christian Empire, in H. Amirav et al. (eds.): From Rome to Constantinople. Studies in Honour of Averil Cameron, Leuven: Peeters, 2007, 67–84.
Martindale, John: The Prosopography of the Later Roman Empire III, Cambridge 1992, 1060–1066.
Max, Gerald E.,  "Procopius' Portrait of the (Western Roman) Emperor Majorian: History and Historiography,"  Sonderdruck Aus Band 74/1981, pp. 1-6.
Meier, Mischa: Prokop, Agathias, die Pest und das ′Ende′ der antiken Historiographie, in Historische Zeitschrift 278 (2004), 281–310.
Meier, Mischa and Federico Montinaro (eds.): A Companion to Procopius of Caesarea. Brill, Leiden 2022, ISBN 978-3-89781-215-4.
Pazdernik, Charles F.: Xenophon’s Hellenica in Procopius’ Wars: Pharnabazus and Belisarius, in: Greek, Roman and Byzantine Studies 46 (2006) 175–206. 
Rance, Philip: Narses and the Battle of Taginae (552 AD): Procopius and Sixth-Century Warfare, in: Historia. Zeitschrift für alte Geschichte 30.4 (2005) 424–472.
Rubin, Berthold: Prokopios, in Realencyclopädie der Classischen Altertumswissenschaft 23/1 (1957), 273–599. Earlier published (with index) as Prokopios von Kaisareia, Stuttgart: Druckenmüller, 1954.
Stewart, Michael, Contests of Andreia in Procopius’ Gothic Wars, Παρεκβολαι 4 (2014), pp. 21–54. 
Stewart, Michael, The Andreios Eunuch-Commander Narses: Sign of a Decoupling of martial Virtues and Hegemonic Masculinity in the early Byzantine Empire?, Cerae 2 (2015), pp. 1–25. 
Stewart, Michael, Masculinity, Identity, and Power Politics in the Age of Justinian: A Study of Procopius, Amsterdam: Amsterdam University Press, 2020:https://www.aup.nl/en/book/9789462988231/masculinity-identity-and-power-politics-in-the-age-of-justinian
Treadgold, Warren: The Early Byzantine Historians, Basingstoke: Macmillan 2007, 176–226.
 The Secret History of Art by Noah Charney on the Vatican Library and Procopius. An article by art historian Noah Charney about the Vatican Library and its famous manuscript, Historia Arcana by Procopius.
Whately, Conor, Battles and Generals: Combat, Culture, and Didacticism in Procopius' Wars. Leiden, 2016. 
Whitby, L. M. "Procopius and the Development of Roman Defences in Upper Mesopotamia", in P. Freeman and D. Kennedy (ed.), The Defence of the Roman and Byzantine East, Oxford, 1986, 717–35.

External links

Texts of Procopius 
 Complete Works, Greek text (Migne Patrologia Graeca) with analytical indexes
 The Secret History, English translation (Atwater, 1927) at the Internet Medieval Sourcebook
 The Secret History, English translation (Dewing, 1935) at LacusCurtius
 The Buildings, English translation (Dewing, 1935) at LacusCurtius
 The Buildings, Book IV Greek text with commentaries, index nominum, etc. at Sorin Olteanu's LTDM Project
 
 
 
 H. B. Dewing's Loeb edition of the works of Procopius: vols. I–VI at the Internet Archive (History of the Wars, Secret History)
 Palestine Pilgrims' Text Society (1888): Of the buildings of Justinian by Procopius, (ca 560 A.D)
 Complete Works 1, Greek ed. by K. W. Dindorf, Latin trans. by Claude Maltret in Corpus Scriptorum Historiae Byzantinae Pars II Vol. 1, 1833. (Persian Wars I–II, Vandal Wars I–II)
 Complete Works 2, Greek ed. by K. W. Dindorf, Latin trans. by Claude Maltret in Corpus Scriptorum Historiae Byzantinae Pars II Vol. 2, 1833. (Gothic Wars I–IV)
 Complete Works 3, Greek ed. by K. W. Dindorf, Latin trans. by Claude Maltret in Corpus Scriptorum Historiae Byzantinae Pars II Vol. 3, 1838. (Secret History, Buildings of Justinian)

Secondary material
 
 

500 births
565 deaths
6th-century Byzantine historians
Historians of Justinian I
Secret histories
De bello Gothico
Vandalic War
People of the Roman–Sasanian Wars